I've Come Too Far, released in 1989 on Tyscot Records, is a gospel music album by the American contemporary gospel music group Witness. This album was the first as a quartet after the departure of member Marvie Wright.

Track listing
Without You In My Life
You'll Never Be Alone
I Love You
He's The Reason
I'm Gonna Make It
I Won't Be Silent Anymore
By and By
I've Come Too Far
Station ID (Interlude)
Oh How He Loves Us

Personnel
Lisa Page Brooks: Vocals
Tina Brooks: Vocals
Diane Campbell: Vocals
Yolanda Harris: Vocals

References

1989 albums
Witness (gospel group) albums